Wollongong-Kembla was an electoral district of the Legislative Assembly in the Australian state of New South Wales. It was created in 1941 and abolished in 1968, being split into Wollongong and Kembla.

Members for Wollongong-Kembla

Election results

References

Former electoral districts of New South Wales
1941 establishments in Australia
Constituencies established in 1941
1968 disestablishments in Australia
Constituencies disestablished in 1968